Prater is an unincorporated community located in Buchanan County, Virginia. It is near the intersection of Virginia State Route 83 and County Route 604 in the western portion of the county. The community is the home of Russell Prater Elementary School.

A post office was established at Prater in 1877, and remained in operation until it was discontinued in 1965. According to tradition, Prater was named for the Prater brothers of pioneer settlers.

References

Unincorporated communities in Buchanan County, Virginia
Unincorporated communities in Virginia